Anton Jonsson is a Swedish Magic: The Gathering player. He has retired from professional Magic. At the height of his career, Jonsson was considered one of the best players in the game, and was especially known for his proficiency at Limited, having reached the Top 8 of a Pro Tour five times. In 2010, Jonsson came back to play in Grand Prix Gothenburg, where he reached yet another Top 8, five years after his last Top 8 appearance. He was voted into the Magic The Gathering Pro Tour Hall of Fame in 2011 along with Steve O'Mahoney-Schwartz and Shuhei Nakamura.

Achievements

References

Living people
Swedish Magic: The Gathering players
People from Umeå
1977 births